The Brač Channel is a channel in the Adriatic Sea between the Dalmatian mainland and the island of Brač.

Sources
 Brački kanal 

Adriatic Sea
Landforms of Split-Dalmatia County